Devyn is a unisex given name of English origin, meaning “bard, poet,” perhaps meaning “young deer.” Devyn is a version of Devin (Irish, Gaelic). Devyn is also a form of Devon (English).

The name Devyn was given to 259 girls and 107 boys born in the US in 2015. Variants include Devyne and Devynne.

Notable people include:

Devyn
Devyn Dalton, American actress and stuntwoman
Devyn Jambga (born 1995), American-Zimbabwean football (soccer) player 
Devyn Leask (born 1999), Zimbabwean swimmer
Devyn Marble (born 1992), American basketball player
Devyn Puett (born 1977), American actress and singer
Devyn Rose, American singer-songwriter

Devyne
Devyne Rensch (born 2003), Dutch footballer

Devynne
Devynne Charlton (born 1995), Bahamian athlete specialising in the 100 metres hurdles